Kieran Harper is a former professional Australian rules footballer. Harper played for the North Melbourne Football Club in the Australian Football League, also known and referred to as the AFL.

Kieran was taken with pick 27 in the 2010 national draft and made his debut in Round 6, 2011 against . He remained with the club until he was delisted in October 2015.

In February 2016, Harper joined the University Blues Football Club. However due to an ongoing ankle injury which plagued his AFL career, he missed a majority of the season.

References

External links

1992 births
Living people
North Melbourne Football Club players
Australian rules footballers from Victoria (Australia)
Eastern Ranges players